Alderney Gambling Control Commission (AGCC) was established in May 2000.  The Commission is independent and non political, and regulates eGambling on behalf of the States of Alderney.  The Commission ensures that its regulatory and supervisory approach meets the very highest of international standards. The mission of AGCC is to maintain the integrity and ensure fairness of online gambling business in Alderney. The commission seeks all aspects of online gambling services to be delivered in accordance with high industry standards, based on the principles of honesty. These aspects include such issues as funding, gains pay offs, software performed processes, etc. The commission claims to protect players' interests from any kind of criminal influence. The Commission is chaired by Lord Faulkner of Worcester.

References

External links
 Alderney Gambling Control Commission

Organisations based in Alderney